Hung Hom Estate is a public housing estate in Hung Hom, Kowloon, Hong Kong. The estate is built on a hill along Dyer Avenue and next to Whampoa Estate, Whampoa Garden and MTR Whampoa station. It now consists of five residential buildings completed in two stages in 1999 and 2011 respectively.

Background
The estate, informally called Tai Wan Shan Resettlement Estate or Tai Wan Shan Estate, was a resettlement estate built in Tai Wan Shan, a hill in Hung Hom area. It had four 7-storey blocks completed in 1956. All four blocks were demolished for redevelopment in 1996 and 2000. Completed in 1999, redevelopment phase 1 project consists of two residential buildings built in the former site of Block 3 and 4. Redevelopment phase 2, finished in 2011, consists of three more 40-storey buildings on the former site of Block 1 and Block 3.

Houses

Demographics
According to the 2016 by-census, Hung Hom Estate had a population of 6,623. The median age was 52.6 and the majority of residents (97.5 per cent) were of Chinese ethnicity. The average household size was 2.4 people. The median monthly household income of all households (i.e. including both economically active and inactive households) was HK$20,000.

Politics
Hung Hom Estate is located in Ka Wai constituency of the Kowloon City District Council. It is currently represented by Chau Hei-man, who was elected in the 2019 elections.

See also

Public housing estates in Hung Hom, To Kwa Wan and Ma Tau Wai

References

 	
Public housing estates in Hong Kong
Hung Hom
Residential buildings completed in 1956
Residential buildings completed in 1999
Residential buildings completed in 2011